Gilmore College for Girls was founded in 1925 as the Footscray Domestic Arts School in response to the vast demand for employment in the Domestic Arts. Aspirations for young women have progressed greatly over the decades and Gilmore College changed and developed continually.

Consequently, the name of the College has changed over the decades to reflect the rapid progress in girls’ education. In 1996 the college became Gilmore College in recognition of Dame Mary Gilmore.

Gilmore College for Girls ran the International Baccalaureate Middle Years Programme (IB MYP) from year 7 to 10.
In 2020, Gilmore College for Girls merged with Footscray City College to become "Footscray High School", retaining both the Barkly Street and Kinnear Street campuses and adding a 3rd campus at Pilgrim Street in 2021.

References

Secondary schools in Melbourne
Educational institutions established in 1925
1925 establishments in Australia